Orion's Arm (also called the Orion's Arm Universe Project, OAUP, or simply OA and formerly known as the Orion's Arm Worldbuilding Group) is a multi-authored online science fiction world-building project, first established in 2000 by M. Alan Kazlev, Donna Malcolm Hirsekorn, Bernd Helfert and Anders Sandberg and further co-authored by many people since.  Anyone can contribute articles, stories, artwork, or music to the website. A large mailing list exists, in which members debate aspects of the world they are creating, discussing additions, modifications, issues arising, and work to be done.

A computer game and a tabletop role-playing game are being developed by the community, within the OA milieu.  There is an ezine for Orion's Arm fiction, art, and commentary, called Voices: Future Tense, add-ons for the Celestia program to displaying Orion's Arm planets, spacecraft and other objects, and additional transhumanist flavored SF illustrations.

The first published Orion's Arm book, a collection of five novellas set within the OA universe, called Against a Diamond Sky, was released in September 2009 by Outskirts Press.
The second published Orion's Arm book, called After Tranquility, was released in February 2014.

Setting
The fictional history of the OA setting spans over 10,000 years, beginning with the real-world present day; dates in OA are marked according to the Tranquility Calendar (which is named after Tranquility Base and started after the Apollo 11 landing). OA claims to adhere to plausible, or "hard" science fiction; that is, there are no human-like aliens, no literal faster-than-light travel or other violations of the known laws of physics, and no "naval analogy" space battles. Certain speculative technologies, such as the creation of "negative mass" (averaged null energy condition-violating) exotic matter and the manipulation of strange forms of matter, such as magnetic monopoles and Q-balls, on length scales much smaller than that of an atom, strong artificial intelligence and artificial life appear in the setting, distinguishing it from "ultra-hard" science fiction (which assumes only technologies proven to be possible at the time it is written).

Brain-computer interfaces, or "DNIs" (Direct Neural Interfaces), are required to operate most forms of common technology, and an option to use machine translation to unwittingly use a foreign language is considered a basic capability and component. Virtual reality technology is ubiquitous and advanced, with some societies choosing to live entirely within simulated universes. These and other simulated reality technologies lead to such risks as "actualys," a condition where one loses the ability to distinguish between simulation and reality. When software is integral to the functioning of something in the Orion's Arm Universe, it is usually sentient, if not necessarily sophont. Mind uploading is also commonplace, as is partial and total copying of a person's mind-state for various purposes.

The largest and most advanced polities in the setting are the sixteen "Sephirotic Empires," so named due to their loose correlation with the archetypes of ancient Kabbalistic mysticism. The denizens of these societies are ruled over by god-like, superintelligent artificial intelligences (AIs), called "archailects", the descendants of humanity's early artificial life experimentation. These beings are so powerful that they can utilize spacetime engineering to create new miniature universes, and are completely beyond the comprehension of normal humans. They exist as distributed intelligences in networks of planet-sized computer brains; their subroutines are themselves sentient, making an "archai" an individual and a civilization at the same time.

Although generally considered to offer the highest degree of safety and quality of life in the civilized galaxy, the Sephirotics themselves are essentially benign dictatorships; their citizens are subject to mass surveillance with a utility fog-based technology called "angelnetting", and the local  usually can go through the data gathered in this way to review nearly every social interaction that has ever occurred in the polity. Protection against unreasonable searches and seizures, the right to bear arms and freedom of speech are considered obsolete concepts. Angelnetting, where it allows civilian weapons, restricts their use. Like most contemporary technology, weapons often have some degree of sentience.

Outside the "ultra-civilized" sephirotic regions, there is the periphery, which is described as relatively lawless and as having some brutal dictatorships. Carrying personal weapons is recommended there, but usually is strongly regulated.

Extraterrestrial life exists, but the focus of the setting is on the descendants and creations of Earth life, collectively called "terragen life". Normal humans, called "baselines", are an endangered species. Their genetically and cybernetically enhanced descendants have supplanted them.

There are many types of intelligent life: nearbaselines (enhanced humans), posthumans, cyborgs, vecs (intelligent robots; named for Hans Moravec),  (intelligent computers), uploads (intelligences transferred into computers), neumanns (self-replicating robots; named for John von Neumann), provolves (animals with enhanced intelligence, similar to "uplift" - see below), rianths (humans with animal DNA spliced in), splices (similar to provolves, upgraded with human DNA), neogens (life genetically synthesized from non-life) and xenosophonts (intelligent aliens). Nanotechnology is common. Ringworlds, Dyson spheres and other "megastructures" exist. Much of civilised space is connected by a network of wormholes.

OA is a part of the transhumanist space opera subgenre. The world was influenced by Iain M. Banks' Culture series, Vernor Vinge's A Fire Upon the Deep, and David Brin's Uplift Universe, among others. It takes the concept of the technological singularity directly from the work of Vernor Vinge among others. In Orion's Arm, there is not one singularity but at least six, and they refer not to stages in the technological development of civilizations as a whole, but to different levels of consciousness in individuals. The concept of Toposophics used in this setting is inspired by the work of Stanisław Lem.

Prominent theoretical technologies
Technologies that feature prominently in the Orion's Arm setting include:
 Advanced nanotechnology able to manipulate matter.
 Extremely advanced artificial intelligences possessing vast superintelligence.
 Space megastructures.
 Production and manipulation of averaged null energy condition-violating negative stress energy tensor fields, including quintessence and scalar quantum field fluctuations, for use in reactionless space drives and wormholes.
 Stable wormholes, allowing apparent faster-than-light travel between star systems, though they must be transported to the systems at sublight speeds (with physical limitations intended to prevent time travel).
 Several types of reactionless sublight space drive, including almost all of the types described by NASA's Breakthrough Propulsion Physics Program, though in the setting most of these are in the process of being replaced by various space drives, including Displacement, Halo, and Void drives, which are themselves based upon the ESAA/Van den Broeck metric solution to the Alcubierre/Natario warp drive.

Prominent theoretical artifacts
Types of megastructure that feature prominently in the Orion's Arm setting include:
 Dyson spheres (shells around stars), both swarm-based and dynamically supported.
 Ringworlds (rigid hoops around stars at a distance of about 1 AU).
 Bishop Rings (large ring-shaped habitats), described as the largest spinning ring-shaped habitats that can be built using non-exotic materials. Similar to Iain M. Bank's Orbitals or Halo.
 Complex orbital ring variants (suprastellar and supraplanetary shells) that perform functions similar to Dyson spheres.
Shellworlds
Topopoli

Types of nanotechnology-based artifact include:
 Utility fog (swarms of microscale robots that act as a reconfigurable bulk material).
 Disassembler swarms (grey goo-like swarms of nanorobots that dismantle hostile craft/objects).
 Angelnets / Demonnets / Guardwebs (nanotechnology-based infrastructures allowing for complete control of the local environment, up to and including mind uploading in the case of severe accidents, that provides backup copies in addition to its holodeck-like uses).

Other noteworthy artifacts are usually unique items whose principles of operation are unknowable to "baseline" humans (named Clarketech, after Clarke's third law).

Reception
Orion's Arm has been reviewed in the role-playing magazine Knights of the Dinner Table, as well as on Boing Boing by transhumanist science fiction author Cory Doctorow.

References to the Encyclopaedia Galactica have been made in a book on overcoming Librarian stereotypes.

The Orion's Arm website has also been recommended in a children's teaching guide.

See also
Collaborative fiction
Eclipse Phase
Transhuman Space
Hannu Rajaniemi's Jean le Flambeur novel trilogy: The Quantum Thief, The Fractal Prince and The Causal Angel

References

External links
 

Collaborative fiction
Science fiction websites
Transhumanism in fiction
Fiction set in the 7th millennium or beyond
Fictional elements introduced in 2000
Fiction about consciousness transfer
Artificial intelligence in fiction
Brain–computer interfacing in fiction
Cybernetted society in fiction
Cyborgs in fiction
Fiction about robots
Biorobotics in fiction
Genetic engineering in fiction
Nanotechnology in fiction
Augmented reality in fiction
Virtual reality in fiction
Space opera
Hard science fiction
Postcyberpunk
Biopunk
Speculative fiction
Future history
Fiction about outer space
Speculative evolution
Religion in science fiction